Swider is a surname of Polish-language origin. Notable people with the surname include:
 Cole Swider (born 1999), American basketball player
 Józef Świder (1930–2014), Polish composer
 Larry Swider (born 1955), American football player
 Mike Swider (born 1955), American football coach
 Nancy Swider-Peltz (born 1956), American speed skater
 Nancy Swider-Peltz Jr. (born 1987), American speed skater

References

See also
 
 Świderski

Polish-language surnames